Saitama at-large district is a three-member constituency of the House of Councillors, the upper house of the national Diet of Japan. It consists of Saitama and elects three Councillors for six-year terms every three years by single non-transferable vote.

Until a reapportionment in the 1990s, effective in the 1995 and 1998 Councillors elections, Saitama was a two-member district electing a total of four Councillors.

Current Councillors from Saitama are:
 in the class of 2016 (term ends 2022):
 Masakazu Sekiguchi (LDP, Nukaga faction), 4th term,
 Makoto Nishida (Kōmeitō), 3rd term,
 Kiyoshi Ueda (Ind.), 1st term.
 in the class of 2007 (term ends 2013):
 Kuniko Kōda (DPJ), 1st term,
 Toshiharu Furukawa (LDP, Machimura faction), 3rd term, and
 Ryūji Yamane (DPJ, Kawabata (=ex-DSP) group), 2nd term.

Recent election results

Historical Councillors elected from Saitama 

Party affiliations as of election day; #: resigned to run in Saitama gubernatorial election; †: died in office.

References 
House of Councillors: Alphabetical list of former Councillors

Saitama Prefecture
Districts of the House of Councillors (Japan)